The girl's artistic individual all-around at the 2014 Summer Youth Olympics was held on August 20 at the Nanjing Olympic Sports Centre.

Qualification

Eighteen gymnasts qualified into the all-around final.

Medalists

Final results

Reserves
The reserves for the All Around Final were:
 (19th place)
 (20th place)
 (21st place)
 (22nd place)

References 

Gymnastics at the 2014 Summer Youth Olympics